Leucania zeae is a species of moth of the family Noctuidae. It is found in North Africa, southern Europe, Turkey, Israel, Iran, Iraq, Saudi Arabia, central Asia and western China.

Adults are on wing from March to November. There are multiple generation per year.

Recorded food plants include Arundo donax, Zea mays and other Gramineae species including cereals in Europe. It is occasionally considered a minor pest.

External links
Hadeninae of Israel
Lepiforum.de

z
Moths of Asia
Moths of Europe
Moths of the Middle East
Insects of Turkey
Taxa named by Philogène Auguste Joseph Duponchel
Moths described in 1827